The Maxus T60 is a mid-size pickup truck manufactured by SAIC Motor under the Maxus brand since November 2016. It is the first pick-up truck from SAIC built for the global market.

In April 2019, an upgraded version called the Maxus T70 was unveiled at the 2019 Auto Shanghai. The T60/T70 is also marketed as the MG Extender in Thailand, Laos and Pakistan, and Chevrolet S10 Max in Mexico.

Overview 
The original 2.8-litre T60 debuted at the 2016 Guangzhou International Motor Show in Guangzhou, China. The T60 is the first pickup from SAIC and it is the first Chinese-built pickup truck with 6 airbags. Early test models were equipped with a LFB479Q 1.8L petrol engine coupled with a 5-speed manual transmission, as stated by SAIC to the Chinese Ministry of Industry and Information Technology. The T60 was one of the first SAIC vehicles to be sold under the consumer-to-business (C2B) model, with the customer having the possibility to fully customize the truck on the Maxus website before buying it.

On June 12, 2017, the first batch of 300 T60 pickups were exported to Chile.

Due to government emission regulations, all T60 models from 2020 that are on sale in China are powered by the new 2.0 Euro 6 SAIC-GM Phi diesel engine, and are called "Pioneer edition".

Maxus T70 
At the 2019 Auto Shanghai, SAIC Maxus introduced a new pickup truck, the Maxus T70. The truck, as presented at the 2019 Auto Shanghai, is based on the "T60 Cross" model of the T60, as both trucks have identical paint kit and similar accessories. The T70 is the first Maxus pickup to include the new SAIC-GM π engine that will be used in all new Maxus vehicles.

In July 2020, the Maxus NEW Concept pickup truck was unveiled at the Chengdu Auto Show, intended as a test-bed for the successor of the T70.

A six-speed automatic is paired with both engines. The T70 is the first Maxus truck with an electronic power steering system.

The T70 includes a larger set of wheels (17-inch 6x130 Maxus "Tomahawk") and 255/55R19 Continental ContiSportContact high performance tires, front guard bars, integrated roll cage, rear trailer bar, two-color interior and new Raptor-style front grill with "MAXUS" lettering.

In November 2021, the Maxus T70 Bull Demon King pickup truck was unveiled as the production version of the July 2020 concept Chengdu Auto Show.

Specifications 

The original Maxus T60 is powered by a 2.8 liters R series SC28R engine based on a VM Motori RA 428 engine licence. It is an I4 intercooled, variable-geometry turbocharged diesel engine manufactured by SDEC. In November 2017, two new engine options were added; a 2.0 litre SAIC-GM MGE 20L4E Inline 4 turbocharged engine producing 224 horsepower, with 6 speed manual or 6 speed automatic transmission and an older 2.4 litre Mitsubishi Sirius-family SAIC 4G69S4N Inline 4 naturally aspirated petrol engine, producing 136 horsepower with a 5 speed Aisin manual gearbox.

The T60 is a traditional body-on-frame truck with MacPherson suspension at the front and leaf springs at the rear. The T60 range consists of single cab, extended cab, double cab and extended double cab, combined with either rear-wheel drive or four-wheel-drive, and is powered by turbocharged gasoline or turbocharged direct injection (TDI) diesel engines.

The T60 includes a BorgWarner part-time transfer case, in conjunction with an Eaton automatic differential lock matched with a Shanghai GKN driveshaft. The automatic gearbox is built under licence from Punch Powertrain while the 6-speed manual transmission is built by Hyundai DYMOS (Now Hyundai TRANSYS).

The T60 has a Bosch 9.1 electronic stability control system.

The T60 has an approach angle of 27.2 degrees and a "low speed four-wheel drive" mode, which can amplify the maximum torque to 900 N·m and maximum grade of climb to 54%. The T60 has a maximum wading depth of 800mm.

All versions include three driving modes; Normal, Eco (for increased fuel efficiency), and Power (for increased torque and speed). Luxury versions include a lane departure warning system, 360º surround camera and hill start assist.

The 2.0L Petrol models are equipped with a sunroof.

Powertrains

Special models

T60 Off-road Edition
Introduced at the 2017 Auto Shanghai, the T60 Off-Road Edition is an off-road oriented version of the original 2.8 T60. The T60 Off-Road Edition is first pickup truck in China to comply with the official off-road modification legislation of the Ministry of Industry and Information Technology and legal to drive in China.

This special edition T60 includes off-road equipment such as front and rear metal bumpers, trailer hook, off-road spotlights, engine compartment buckles, new wheels, A/T tires, snorkel and nitrogen shock absorbers.

T60 Cross
At the 2018 Chengdu Auto Show, Maxus introduced the T60 Cross as a new off-road oriented version of the T60, with less radical customizations than the 2017 T60 Off-road Edition, initially offering it as an upgrade kit. The T60 Cross includes a large snorkel air intake, new "Tomahawk" wheels, 255/55R19 high performance tires, front guard bars, new integrated roll cage, armored chassis, rear trailer bar and new luggage racks. The T60 Cross is offered both as an upgrade kit for 2.8L T60s and in 12 stock models.

Trailrider
Special edition for Australia with an updated suspension tuned by Walkinshaw Automotive Group, larger wheels (17-inch 6x130 Maxus "Tomahawk"), 255/55R19 Continental ContiSportContact tires and front guard bars.

The Trailrider 2, launched in May 2020, is powered by the new SAIC-GM SC20M diesel engine found in the new Maxus T70.

Pioneer Edition
The T60 Pioneer Edition is a special 2020 edition sold in Mainland China, powered by the new SAIC-GM "Phi" engine.

Export markets 
As of 2019, the Maxus T60 is sold in Australia, Bahrain, Bolivia (4G69 S4N engine), Brunei, Chile, Mainland China, Costa Rica (SC28R 136.2 Q4 engine), Dominican Republic, Kuwait, Libya (4G69 S4N engine), Malaysia, Myanmar, New Zealand, Panama (SC28R 136.2 Q4 engine), Peru (2.8L diesel), Philippines (SC28R 136.2 Q4 engine), Saudi Arabia, Tahiti (2.8L diesel), Thailand, the UAE and Venezuela.

Sales are set to start in the United Kingdom in Q4 2019.

Australia

On September 25, 2017, the T60 was officially launched in Australia as the LDV T60. It became the first Chinese-manufactured utility pick-up truck to score 5 stars on the ANCAP rating. It undercuts many other utility trucks in the Australian market.

The Australian delivered models also come with a 5-year, 130,000 km warranty including roadside assistance. In March 2022 it was announced an electric model, known as the LDV eT60, would be released in Australia by the end of the year. In November 2022, the LDV eT60 and LDV eDeliver 9 were launched in Australia.

3 trim levels  are available in Australia. All of include 2.8L SC28R 150 Q5 VGT (Euro 5) diesel engine, 6 airbags, disc brakes, ABS, EBA, EBD, Hill Descent Control, Traction Control System, hill start assist, TPMS, TCS and VCD.

 Cab Chassis (4WD) manual transmission. (Special order through LDV dealers, not sold on showroom floors)
 PRO (4WD) dual cab, manual & automatic transmission.
 LUXE (4WD) dual cab, manual & automatic transmission.
 Trailrider (4WD) dual cab, manual & automatic transmission. (Special edition limited to 300-500 units per year, not released in 2021 due to supply chain constraints)

Chile
Chile became the first foreign market to sell the T60. Kaufmann Group subsidiary Andes Motor is the official distributor of the Maxus brand for Chile.

Pre-sales started in July 2017, with the first units being delivered in September 2017 with a 3-year, 100000 km warranty.

In April 2018, Andes Motor reported already having sold more than a thousand units and by the end of the year it became the 10th most-sold pick up truck of 2018, outpacing all Chinese competitors according to the National Automotive Association of Chile.

Models available 
There are 3 trim levels available in Chile. All models include the 2.8L SC28R 150 Q5 VGT (Euro 5) diesel engine.
 DX (2WD, 4WD) Single cab, dual cab, manual
 GL (2WD, 4WD) dual cab, manual & automatic (2WD only)
 GLX (4WD) dual cab, automatic

MG Extender 
The MG Extender a rebadged version of the T70 assembled in Thailand by SAIC-CP since 2019. Besides replacing the badges, the changes MG made to the T70 is a reworked grille and wheel design. It received a facelift in 2021.

Chevrolet S10 Max 
In late 2021, General Motors introduced the vehicle as the Chevrolet S10 Max for the Mexican market.

Sales

References

External links

 Official website

T60
Cars introduced in 2016
Cars of China
Pickup trucks
Rear-wheel-drive vehicles
All-wheel-drive vehicles
Off-road vehicles
ANCAP pick-ups